Sam Williams may refer to:

Sports

American football
 Sam Williams (defensive back) (born 1952), American football player
 Sam Williams (defensive lineman) (1931–2013), Detroit Lions football player of the 1960s
 Sam Williams (linebacker) (born 1980), American football linebacker
 Sam Williams (defensive end, born 1999), American football player

Basketball
 Sam Williams (basketball, born 1924) (1924–2012), American college basketball coach
 Sam Williams (basketball, born 1945), American basketball player for the Milwaukee Bucks
 Sam Williams (basketball, born 1959), American basketball player for the Golden State Warriors and Philadelphis 76ers

Other sports
 Sam Williams (soccer) (born 2005), American soccer player
 Sam Williams (rugby league) (born 1991), Australian rugby league footballer
 Sam Williams (footballer) (born 1987), English Association footballer
 Sam Williams (baseball) (1922–2007), American Negro leagues baseball player
 Sam Williams (rugby union) (1862–?), rugby union footballer

Other
 Sam Williams (journalist) (born 1969), American journalist
 Sam Williams (record producer), Supergrass producer and member of The Animalhouse
 Sam B. Williams (1921–2009), American inventor
 Big Sam (musician) (Sam Williams), trombonist and band leader from New Orleans

See also
 Samuel Williams (disambiguation)
 Sammy Williams (1948–2018), American actor
 Sammy Williams (American football) (born 1974), American football offensive lineman